Anna Aleksandrovna Mastyanina (born December 28, 1987) is a Russian sport shooter. She won a silver medal in the women's sport pistol at the 2010 ISSF World Cup series in Sydney, Australia, with a total score of 781.2 points, earning her a spot on the Russian team for the 2012 Olympics. Mastyanina isa member of  the shooting team for Armiya Sports Club, and is coached and trained by Aleksandr Suslov.

Mastyanina represented Russia at the 2012 Summer Olympics in London, where she competed in the women's 25 m pistol, along with her teammate Kira Mozgalova. Mastyanina shot 286 targets in the precision stage, and 292 in the rapid-fire, for a total score of 578 points and a bonus of 20 inner tens, finishing in twenty-fourth place.

References

External links
NBC Olympics Profile

1987 births
Living people
Russian female sport shooters
Olympic shooters of Russia
Shooters at the 2012 Summer Olympics
Sportspeople from Samara, Russia
European Games competitors for Russia
Shooters at the 2015 European Games
20th-century Russian women
21st-century Russian women